The 1985 Tolly Cobbold English Professional Championship was a professional non-ranking snooker tournament, which took place between 5 and 10 February 1985 in Ipswich, England.

Steve Davis won the title by defeating Tony Knowles 9–2 in the final.

Main draw

References

English Professional Championship
English Professional Championship
English Professional Championship
English Professional Championship